The Maryland Comptroller election of 2010, was held on November 2, 2010. Incumbent Democratic Comptroller Peter Franchot ran for a second term and faced off against former Amtrak CFO William H. Campbell in the general election, whom he defeated in a landslide.

Democratic primary

Candidates
 Peter Franchot, incumbent Comptroller of Maryland

Declined
 Brian Feldman, state senator

Results

Republican primary

Candidates
 William H. Campbell, former Amtrak Chief Financial Officer
 Brendan Madigan, political consultant
 Armand F. Girard, math teacher

Results

General election

Results

References

Comptroller
Maryland
Maryland comptroller elections